A veve (also spelled vèvè or vevè) is a religious symbol commonly used in different branches of Vodun throughout the African diaspora, such as Haitian Vodou and Louisiana Voodoo. The veve acts as a "beacon" for the lwa, and will serve as a lwas representation during rituals.

Veves should not be confused with the patipembas used in Palo, nor the pontos riscados used in Umbanda and Quimbanda, as these are separate African religions.

History
Possible origins include the cosmogram of the Kongo people, or originated as the Nsibidi system of writing for the Igboid and Ekoid languages from West and Central Africa.

Function
According to Milo Rigaud, "The veves represent figures of the astral forces... In the course of Vodou ceremonies, the reproduction of the astral forces represented by the veves obliges the lwa... to descend to earth."

Every lwa has their own unique veve, although regional differences have led to different veves for the same lwa in some cases. Sacrifices and offerings are usually placed upon them, with food and drink being most commonly used.

Presentation
In ritual and other formalities, veve is usually drawn on the floor by strewing a powder-like substance, commonly cornmeal, wheat flour, bark, red brick powder, or gunpowder, though the material depends entirely upon the ritual. In Haitian Vodou, a mixture of cornmeal and wood ash is used.

Veves use symbolism to communicate which spirit is being called upon - for example, gatekeeper Papa Legba is invoked with a vèvè that features a walking cane, to indicate his jolly grandpa-like demeanor. The illustration also features coded images that reflect the matrilineal and patrilineal culture of the artist, providing information about their ancestral lineage. Offerings will typically be given; in Louisiana Voodoo, this would entail a cup of coffee and/or candies associated with the spirit. 

The spirit is generally meant to be invoked in the central cross of the veve.

Veve can be made into screenprint, painting, patchwork etc., as wall hangings, artworks, and banners.

Examples

See also
 Sigil (magic)

References

External links
 Source
 Extensive collection of Veves

Religious symbols
Voodoo
Proto-writing
Magic symbols